MOMIX is a dance company based in Washington, Connecticut, founded in 1981 by choreographer Moses Pendleton.  MOMIX was conceptualised out of work Pendleton did for a celebration of Erik Satie at the Paris Opera in 1978. The company is named after a solo, "Momix," that Pendleton created for the 1980 Winter Olympics in Lake Placid. An offshoot of the dance company Pilobolus, which Pendleton co-founded in 1971, MOMIX presents works that combine acrobatics, dance, gymnastics, mime, props, and film in a theatrical setting. The company has toured internationally, performing on five continents. MOMIX is a for-profit contemporary dance company.

Theatre, film and television

MOMIX has made five Italian RAI television features broadcast to 55 countries (including the USSR and China) and has performed on Antenne II in France. MOMIX was also featured in PBS's “Dance in America” series and on Canadian television with Charles Dutoit and the Montreal Symphony in the Rhombus Media film of Mussorgsky's “Pictures at an Exhibition,” winner of an International Emmy for Best Performing Arts Special.

In 1992, Pendleton created "Bat Habits," developed with the support of the Scottsdale (Arizona) Cultural Council/Scottsdale Center for the Arts and the University of Washington to celebrate the opening of the San Francisco Giants' new spring training park in Scottsdale, Arizona. This work was the forerunner of “Baseball,” which was created by Pendleton in 1994.

MOMIX is featured in one of the first IMAX films in 3-D, “IMAGINE,” which premiered at the Taejon Expo 93 and was subsequently released at IMAX theaters worldwide. In the film “FX II,” under the direction of Moses Pendleton, MOMIX dancers Cynthia Quinn and Karl Baumann star in the role of “Bluey.”  In 2004, “White Widow,” co-choreographed by Pendleton and Cynthia Quinn, was featured in Robert Altman's movie, “The Company.” The company has also participated in the "Homage a Picasso" in Paris and was selected to represent the United States at the European Cultural Center at Delphi.

Corporate work
MOMIX has created special shows for product launches as well as national television commercials for major corporations. Clients have included Mercedes Benz, Fiat, BMW, Kohler, Hanes, Target Stores, Walmart, and MAC Cosmetics.

Productions 
 PASSION (1990)  
 BASEBALL (1994)
 OPUS CACTUS (2001)
 LUNAR SEA (2004)
 BOTANICA (2009)
 ALCHEMY (2013)
 VIVA MOMIX (2015)
 ALICE (2019)

Artistic staff 
 Artistic Director, Moses Pendleton
 Associate Director, Cynthia Quinn

Dancers 
 Jennifer Chicheportiche 
 Rebecca Rasmussen (Dance Captain)
 Catherine Jaeger
 Sarah Nachbauer  
 Simona Di Tucci 
 Beau Campbell
 Lauren Jaeger
 Steven Ezra (Dance Captain)
 Greg Dearmond
 Anthony Bocconi
 Jason Williams
 Morgan Hulen
 Jade Primicias 
 Heather Conn
 Sean Langford
 Seah Hagan
 Colton Wall
 Elise Pacicco
 Aurelie Garcia
 Nathaniel Davis
 Adam Ross
 Derek Elliott Jr

References

External links
Momix website
Selby/Artists MGMT – Artist Representation
Facebook
Youtube
Instagram
Archival footage of Momix performing Moses Pendleton's Passion in 2002 at Jacob's Pillow Dance Festival.
 http://www.huffingtonpost.com/alexandra-villarreal/momixs-alchemia-defies-re_b_7884724.html 
 https://www.washingtonpost.com/entertainment/theater_dance/a-cornucopia-from-momix/2015/04/23/acbc98ba-e76b-11e4-aae1-d642717d8afa_story.html

Dance companies in the United States
Washington, Connecticut
Dance in Connecticut
Arts organizations established in 1981
1981 establishments in Connecticut